Commodity plastics or commodity polymers are plastics produced in high volumes for applications where exceptional material properties are not needed (such as packaging, food containers, and household products). In contrast to engineering plastics, commodity plastics tend to be inexpensive to produce and exhibit relatively weak mechanical properties. Some examples of commodity plastics are polyethylene, polypropylene, polystyrene, polyvinyl chloride, and poly(methyl methacrylate). Globally, the most widely used thermoplastic includes both Polypropylene and Polyethylene.

Products made from commodity plastics include disposable plates, disposable cups, photographic and magnetic tape, clothing, reusable bags, medical trays, and seeding trays. Several investigations suggest that the kinetics of thermal degradation of commodity plastics is important to realize the complications it may bring because of the temperature that it goes through which includes production process or manufacturing process. Plastic includes high molecular weight and burning them is too risky as it is interacted with mass and energy transport which brings complications if not properly investigated. Despite the complications of plastics, plastic makers recycle for new growth as it introduces with how countries like the United States have limited the use of products made by plastics and it has also been trending in Europe and Japan. The tactics of marketing strategies to recycle plastics can be a huge growth to plastic makers as people tend to purchase the recycled materials more. Companies like Procter & Gamble and Clorox makes the use of recycled products to manufacture household products.

Further reading
 Engineering plastics
 High performance plastics
 Haugan, Harold W. Fantastic Plastics—Welcome Aboard (Exposition Press Books, 1974)

References

Plastics